Marko Marinović (born 15 March 1983) is a Serbian professional basketball coach and former player.

Professional career
On 12 July 2013, Marinović signed with Radnički Kragujevac for the 2013–14 season. On 11 December 2013, he tied the Eurocup’s all-time single-game assist record with 15 in his team’s 91-81 victory over Neptunas Klaipeda.

In September 2014, Marinović signed a one-year deal with the Slovenian team Union Olimpija. In July 2015, he signed with Romanian club Steaua București for the 2015–16 season. Marinović started the 2016–17 season with SCM CSU Craiova, but left the club in late December 2016. 

On 1 January 2017, Marinović returned to his first club Borac Čačak. On 29 June 2019, Marinović announced his retirement from playing professional career.

National team career
Marinović was a member of the Yugoslavian under-20 team that took part in the 2000 European Championship. Three years later he won the gold medal with Serbia and Montenegro at the 2003 World University Games.

Marinović played at the 2006 FIBA World Championship in Japan with the Serbian national team. He averaged 5.3 points, 0.3 rebounds and 0.8 assists per game.

Coaching career 

On 29 June 2019, Marinović was named a head coach for his hometown team Borac Čačak. On 28 November 2022, Borac parted ways with him following a 1–7 run on the start of the 2022–23 ABA League First Division.

In November 2021, Marinović was named an assistant coach for the Serbia national team under Svetislav Pešić. He was a staff member at EuroBasket 2022.

References

External links

 Marko Marinović at aba-liga.com
 Marko Marinović at acb.com
 Marko Marinović at eurobasket.com
 Marko Marinović at euroleague.net
 Marko Marinović at fiba.com

1983 births
Living people
2006 FIBA World Championship players
ABA League players
Alba Berlin players
Basketball League of Serbia players
Basketball players from Čačak
BC Enisey players
BC Krasnye Krylia players
BC Levski Sofia players
CB Girona players
KK Borac Čačak players
KK Borac Čačak coaches
KK Crvena zvezda players
KK FMP (1991–2011) players
KK Radnički Kragujevac (2009–2014) players
KK Olimpija players
Liga ACB players
Menorca Bàsquet players
Point guards
SCM U Craiova (basketball) players
Serbian expatriate basketball people in Bulgaria
Serbian expatriate basketball people in Germany
Serbian expatriate basketball people in Romania
Serbian expatriate basketball people in Russia
Serbian expatriate basketball people in Slovenia
Serbian expatriate basketball people in Spain
Serbian men's basketball coaches
Serbian men's basketball players
Valencia Basket players
Universiade medalists in basketball
Universiade gold medalists for Serbia and Montenegro
Medalists at the 2003 Summer Universiade